Timur Taimurazovich Pukhov (born 17 June 1998) is a Russian football player who plays for Naftan Novopolotsk.

Club career
He made his debut for the main PFC CSKA Moscow squad on 10 October 2018 in a Russian Cup game against FC Tyumen and scored a goal on his debut.

On 8 February 2019 he moved to Lithuania, becoming a player of FK Žalgiris. He was assigned number 70 shirt.

On 3 July 2019, he signed with FC Shinnik Yaroslavl. He made his Russian Football National League debut for Shinnik on 13 July 2019 in a game against FC Mordovia Saransk.

On 10 December 2022, Ararat Yerevan announced that Pukhov had left by mutual consent.

References

External links
 
 
 

1998 births
Sportspeople from Vladikavkaz
Living people
Russian footballers
Association football midfielders
PFC CSKA Moscow players
FK Žalgiris players
FC Shinnik Yaroslavl players
FC Irtysh Omsk players
FC Amkar Perm players
FC Ararat Yerevan players
FC Naftan Novopolotsk players
Russian First League players
Russian Second League players
A Lyga players
Russian expatriate footballers
Expatriate footballers in Lithuania
Expatriate footballers in Armenia
Expatriate footballers in Belarus
Russian expatriate sportspeople in Lithuania
Russian expatriate sportspeople in Armenia